The Port–Manning House is a historic home in Salem, Oregon, United States. The house was built in 1884 by Dr. Luke A. Port. The house was designed after the Italianate Victorian style. Under threat of demolition, it was moved from its downtown location to south of the city of Salem in 1972.

The house was listed on the National Register of Historic Places in 1978.

See also
National Register of Historic Places listings in Marion County, Oregon

References

External links

Houses completed in 1884
Houses on the National Register of Historic Places in Salem, Oregon
1884 establishments in Oregon